Avinash Tiwary is an Indian actor who works in Hindi films and series. He began his career with the television series Yudh in 2014 and got his first film role in the film Tu Hai Mera Sunday (2016). He gained recognition for his work in the romance Laila Majnu (2018) and supernatural thriller film Bulbbul (2020). In 2022, Tiwary starred in the Netflix crime series Khakee: The Bihar Chapter.

Early life and education 
Avinash Tiwary was born in Bihar, India. His family relocated to Mumbai after few years.

He completed school and engineering in Mumbai. In order to pursue acting, he quit engineering studies in the fourth semester and joined theater. He joined Barry John's acting studio and later went to New York Film Academy. He started appearing in short films since 2005.

Career 
In theater, he worked with Om Katare, an established artist. After his stint at the New York Film Academy, he started his career with the documentary, Anamika: Her Glorious Past, in 2006. In 2014, he worked alongside Amitabh Bachchan in the TV series Yudh, where he played the role of the villain, Ajat Shatru.

Avinash made his Bollywood debut with Milind Dhaimade's directorial debut, Tu Hai Mera Sunday (2016) co-starring Barun Sobti and Shahana Goswami, which revolves around the lives of five friends. The film had its world premiere at the 60th BFI London Film Festival and received positive critical acclaim.

In 2017, Avinash signed Imtiaz Ali's romantic movie, Laila Majnu, after auditioning for it in December 2015. He took on the lead role of Qais/Majnu in the movie which tells the classic love story of Laila and Majnu but set in contemporary times. It is directed by Sajid Ali and bankrolled by Ekta kapoor. He underwent major physical transformation for the role and received critical acclaim for his natural performance as Majnu.

He signed a three-film deal with Balaji Motion Pictures in 2019.

In 2022, he starred as Chandan Mahto in Neeraj Pandey's show Khakee: The Bihar Chapter. It was premiered on Netflix and co-starred Karan Tacker, Abhimanyu Singh, Jatin Sarna, Ravi Kishan, Ashutosh Rana among others. Just like the show, his performance was positively received by audience and critics. Shubham Kulkarni from Koimoi wrote "Avinash Tiwary seems to be on a roll and there seems to be no way he is going wrong at least right now. He plays the antagonist here who is layered and does complete justice to the part.".

He will be next seen in web series based on Dongri to Dubai, which will be produced by Excel Entertainment.

In the media 
Tiwary was ranked in The Times Most Desirable Men at No. 49 in 2020.

Filmography

Films

Television

References

External links

 

1991 births
Indian male film actors
Living people
Male actors from Mumbai
Male actors in Hindi cinema
People from Bihar
People from Gopalganj district, India